Pseudoricia is a genus of moths of the family Notodontidae. It consists of the following species:
Pseudoricia flavizoma Miller, 2008
Pseudoricia ovisigna  (Prout, 1918) 
Pseudoricia sibyllae  (Druce, 1885) 

Notodontidae of South America